Events in the year 2012 in Germany.

Incumbents

Federal level

 President:
Christian Wulff (until 17 February 2012) 
Horst Seehofer (Acting; 17 February – 18 March 2012)
Joachim Gauck (from 18 March 2012)
 Chancellor: Angela Merkel

State level
 Minister-President of Baden-Wuerttemberg – Winfried Kretschmann
 Minister-President of Bavaria – Horst Seehofer
 Mayor of Berlin – Klaus Wowereit
 Minister-President of Brandenburg – Matthias Platzeck
 Mayor of Bremen – Jens Boehrnsen
 Mayor of Hamburg – Olaf Scholz
 Minister-President of Hesse – Volker Bouffier
 Minister-President of Mecklenburg-Vorpommern – Erwin Sellering
 Minister-President of Niedersachsen – David McAllister
 Minister-President of North Rhine-Westphalia – Hannelore Kraft
 Minister-President of Rhineland-Palatinate – Kurt Beck
 Minister-President of Saarland – Annegret Kramp-Karrenbauer
 Minister-President of Saxony – Stanislaw Tillich
 Minister-President of Saxony-Anhalt – Reiner Haseloff
 Minister-President of Schleswig-Holstein – Peter Harry Carstensen to 12 June Torsten Albig
 Minister-President of Thuringia – Christine Lieberknecht

Events

January – June
 6 January – In state Saarland coalition of Annegret Kramp-Karrenbauer breaks up.
 20 January – Bavarian Film Awards in Munich
 23 January – The drugstore Schlecker files for bankruptcy.
 9–19 February – 62nd Berlin International Film Festival in Berlin
 16 February – Roman Lob is selected to represent Germany in the Eurovision Song Contest.
 17 February – German President Christian Wulff resigns following a major loan scandal.
 19 February – Joachim Gauck is chosen as the main candidate to succeed Christian Wulff.
 27 February – The party Die Linke selects Beate Klarsfeld as its candidate to succeed Christian Wulff.
 29 February – Schlecker announces the closure of half its stores across Germany.
 6–10 March – CeBIT in Hanover
 7–11 March – ITB Berlin in Berlin
 15–18 March – Leipzig Book Fair in Leipzig
 18 March – German presidential election, 2012 – Joachim Gauck is elected President of Germany, taking the oath of office on 23 March
 25 March – 1 April – 2012 World Team Table Tennis Championships in Dortmund
 25 March – Elections in state Saarland
 23–27 April – Hannover Messe in Hanover
 27 April – Deutscher Filmpreis  in Berlin
 6 May – Elections in Schleswig-Holstein
 13 May – Elections in North Rhine-Westphalia – Hannelore Kraft is elected to continue as Minister-President, heading an SPD-Green coalition.
 22 May – Peter Altmaier replaces Norbert Rottgen as Environment Minister.
 26 May – Roman Lob represents Germany in the Eurovision Song Contest, finishing 8th.
 June – The Germany national football team takes part in UEFA Euro 2012.
 9 June – 16 September: dOCUMENTA (13)
 12 June – Torsten Albig is elected as Minister-President of Schleswig-Holstein, after the SPD, Greens and South Schleswig Voter Federation agree to form a coalition in the state.
 18–24 June – Kiel Week in Kiel
 28 June – UEFA Euro 2012: The Germany national football team is knocked out at the Semi Final stage, by the Italy national football team, through two goals from Mario Balotelli.
 Date unknown: As the largest German-Sino transaction ever, at the end of January 2012 German company Putzmeister was sold to the company Chinese Sany Heavy Industries.

July – December 
 3 July – Heinz Fromm resigns as Head of the Federal Office for the Protection of the Constitution, following controversies over the organisation's handling of the far-right.
 early July – Success for German players in the Wimbledon tennis Singles: In the Men's section, Florian Mayer and Philipp Kohlschreiber reach the quarter finals; in the Women's section, Sabine Lisicki reaches the quarter finals, and Angelique Kerber reaches the semi finals.
 13 July – FIFA President Sepp Blatter alleges that there were irregularities when Germany won the right to host the 2006 FIFA World Cup.
 31 July - Germany wins its first Gold Medals of the 2012 Summer Olympics in London, in the Equestrian sport, taking team gold, and with Michael Jung taking individual gold.
 9–12 August – Hanse Sail in Rostock
 31 August – 5 September – Internationale Funkausstellung Berlin in Berlin
 11–16 September – ILA Berlin Air Show in Berlin
 12 September - The German Constitutional Court in Karlsruhe ruled, that the new European bailout fund was inline with the German constitution.
 15–19 September – Gamescom in Cologne
 18–23 September – photokina in Cologne
 20–27 September – Frankfurt Motor Show in Frankfurt
 21 September - JadeWeserPort opened.
 22 September – 7 October – Oktoberfest in Munich
 28 September - The SPD selects Peer Steinbruck as its candidate to face Angela Merkel in the German federal election, 2013.
 4 October - Michael Schumacher announces his retirement from Formula One.
 5 October - Footballer Michael Ballack announces an end to his playing career.
 10–14 October – Frankfurt Book Fair, with special guest New Zealand.
 12 November - 2012 MTV Europe Music Awards in Frankfurt
 25 November - In Formula One, German driver Sebastian Vettel wins the Drivers' Championship for the third consecutive year.
 26 November - A fire at a workshop for disabled people in Southwestern Germany kills 14 people.
 10 December - An explosive device is found, and made safe, at the main railway station in Bonn.
 25 December - Joachim Gauck makes his first Christmas address as President.
 Date unknown:  German company Volkswagen Group acquired Italian company Ducati and German companies MAN and Porsche.

Deaths

January 

 2 January – Helmut Müller-Brühl, 78, conductor (born 1933)
 3 January – Willi Entenmann, 68, footballer and coach (born 1943)
 4 January – Xaver Unsinn, 82, ice hockey player (born 1929)
 8 January – Bernhard Schrader, chemist and academic (born 1931)
 10 January – Kyra T. Inachin, 43, historian (born 1968)
 13 January – Guido Dessauer, 96, paper engineer and art collector (born 1915)
 17 January – Julius Meimberg, 95, Luftwaffe flying ace (born 1917)
 18 January – Georg Lassen, 96, naval officer (born 1915)
 24 January – Vadim Glowna, 70, actor and film director (born 1941)
 25 January – Veronica Carstens, 88, former First Lady (born 1923)

February 

 1 February – Lutz Philipp, 71, Olympic athlete (born 1940)
 2 February – Paul Consbruch, 81, Roman Catholic prelate (born 1930)
 8 February – Gunther Plaut, 99, German-born Canadian rabbi and author (born 1912)
 20 February – Imanuel Geiss, 81, historian (born 1931)
 25 February – Louisiana Red, 79, American blues musician (born 1932)
 27 February – Werner Guballa, 67, Roman Catholic bishop (born 1944)

March 
 11 March – Hans G. Helms, 79, experimental writer (born 1932)
 13 March – Princess Anna of Saxony, 82, noblewoman (born 1929)
 19 March – Karl-Heinz Spickenagel, 80, footballer (born 1932)
 21 March – Albrecht Dietz, 86, entrepreneur and scientist (born 1926)

April 

 5 April – Ferdinand Alexander Porsche, 76, entrepreneur and auto designer (born 1935)
 6 April - Heinz Kunert, German engineer (born 1927)
 9 April – Ivan Nagel, 80, theatre director (born 1931)
 10 April – Barbara Buchholz, 52, musician and composer (born 1959)
 12 April – Manfred Orzessek, 78, footballer (born 1933)
 18 April – Fritz Theilen, 84, resistance activist (born 1927)
 20 April – Peter Carsten, 83, actor (born 1928)
 21 April – Heinz Jentzsch, 92, racehorse trainer (born 1920)

May 

 3 May – Felix Werder, 90, German-born Australian composer (born 1922)
 10 May – Horst Faas, 79, photojournalist (born 1933)
 10 May – Gunther Kaufmann, 64, actor (born 1947)
 12 May – Ernst Josef Fittkau, 75, entomologist (born 1927)
 12 May – Fritz Ursell, 89, German-born British mathematician (born 1923)
 15 May – Peter Koslowski, 59, philosopher and academic (born 1952)
 15 May – Arno Lustiger, 88, Polish-born writer and historian of Judaism (born 1922)
 16 May – Hans Geister, 83, athlete (born 1928)
 18 May – Dietrich Fischer-Dieskau, 86, baritone and conductor (born 1925)
 18 May – Hans-Dieter Lange, 85, television journalist (born 1926)
 19 May - Gerhard Hetz 69, swimmer (born 1942)
 24 May – Klaas Carel Faber, 90, Dutch-born war criminal, died in Ingolstadt (born 1922)
 27 May – Friedrich Hirzebruch, 84, mathematician (born 1927)
 30 May – Gerhard Pohl, 74, politician (born 1937)

June 

 9 June – Audrey Arno, 70, pop singer (born 1942)
 12 June – Margarete Mitscherlich-Nielsen, 94, psychoanalyst (born 1917)
 14 June – Karl-Heinz Kammerling, 82, academic teacher of pianists (born 1930)
 18 June – Lina Haag, 105, anti-fascist activist during World War II. (born 1907)
 20 June – Heinrich IV, Prince Reuss of Kostritz, 92, nobleman (born 1919)
 24 June – Gad Beck, 88, Resistance activist and Holocaust survivor (born 1923)
 24 June – Franz Crass, 84, bass singer (born 1928)
 24 June – Rudolf Schmid, 97, Swiss-born German Roman Catholic bishop (born 1914)
 25 June – Doris Schade, 88, television actress (born 1924)
 27 June – Ralph Warren Victor Elliott, 90, German-born Australian professor of English and runologist (born 1921)

July 

 10 July – Fritz Langanke, 92, Waffen SS Lieutenant (born 1919)
 18 July – Günther Maleuda, 81, politician, President of the People's Chamber (1989–1990) (born 1931)
 19 July – Hans Nowak, 74, footballer (born 1937)
 21 July - Susanne Lothar, 51, actress (born 1960)
 23 July – Maria Emanuel, Margrave of Meissen, 86, head of the Royal House of Saxony (born 1926)
 27 July - Carl-Ludwig Wagner, 82, politician, former Minister-President of Rhineland-Palatinate (born 1930)
 29 July - Heinz Staab, 86, chemist (born 1926)
 31 July - Rudolf Kreitlein, 92, football referee (born 1919)

August 

 2 August - Bernd Meier, 40, footballer (born 1972)
 8 August - Kurt Maetzig, 101, film director (born 1911)
 19 August - Hellmut Geissner, 86, scholar (born 1926)
 21 August - Georg Leber, 91, politician (born 1920)
 24 August - Georg Feuerstein, 65, German-born Canadian scholar of Hinduism (born 1947)
 26 August - Krzysztof Wilmanski, 72, Polish-born German scientist (born 1940)
 28 August - Alfred Schmidt, 81, philosopher (born 1931)
 30 August - Paul Friedrichs, 72, motocross racer (born 1940)
 31 August - Norbert Walter, 67, economist (born 1944)

September 
 8 September - Adolf Bechtold, 86, footballer (born 1926)
 8 September - Peter Hussing, 64, boxer (born 1948)
 16 September - Friedrich Zimmermann, 87, politician (born 1925)
 21 September - Sven Hassel, 95, Danish-born German soldier and author (born 1917)

October 

 1 October - Dirk Bach, 51, comedian, actor and television presenter (born 1961)
 4 October - Erhard Wunderlich, 55, handball player (born 1956)
 6 October - Albert, Margrave of Meissen, 77, nobleman (born 1934)
 11 October - Helmut Haller, 73, footballer (born 1939)
 12 October - Harry Valérien, 88, sports journalist and presenter (born 1923)
 17 October - Henry Friedlander, 82, German-born American Jewish historian (born 1930)
 27 October - Hans Werner Henze, 86, composer (born 1926)
 31 October - Alfons Demming, 84, Roman Catholic prelate (born 1928)

November 
 8 November - Pete Namlook, 51, composer and producer (born 1960)
 10 November - Wilhelm Hennis, 89, political scientist (born 1923)
 18 November - Helmut Sonnenfeldt, 96, German-born American foreign policy official (born 1926)
 29 November - Klaus Schutz, 86, former Mayor of Berlin (born 1926)

December 

 4 December - Peter Kiesewetter, 67, composer (born 1945)
 7 December - Berthold Albrecht, 58, businessman (born 1954)
 11 December - Albert O. Hirschman, 97, German-born American economist (born 1915)
 14 December - Klaus Koste, 69, gymnast (born 1943)
 16 December - Axel Anderson, 83, German-born Puerto Rican actor (born 1929)
 19 December - Peter Struck, 69, politician (born 1943)
 25 December - Rudolf Muller, 81, Roman Catholic prelate (born 1931)
 27 December - Jesco von Puttkamer, 79, German-born American aerospace engineer (born 1933)
 28 December - Emmanuel Scheffer, 88, German-born Israeli football coach (born 1924)

See also
2012 in German television

References

 
Germany
Germany
2010s in Germany
Years of the 21st century in Germany